The 2010 congressional elections in Idaho were held on November 2, 2010, and determined who would represent the state of Idaho in the United States House of Representatives. Idaho has two seats in the House, apportioned according to the 2000 United States Census. Representatives are elected for two-year terms; the winners served in the 112th Congress from January 3, 2011 until January 3, 2013.

Overview

By district
Results of the 2010 United States House of Representatives elections in Idaho by district:

District 1

Overview
In this heavily conservative district that consists of western Idaho and the Idaho Panhandle, incumbent Democratic Congressman Walt Minnick was seen as vulnerable, especially considering the fact that he won in 2008 against an embattled, weakened incumbent. Minnick, however, worked to build a profile as a moderate-to-conservative Democrat, voting against the 2009 Stimulus, the health care reform bill, and the American Clean Energy and Security Act, Furthermore, Congressman Minnick was the only Democrat to receive a perfect score from the Club for Growth, typically an organization that supports conservative Republican candidates for office.

Republican primary
Several Republican candidates, including Iraq War veteran Vaughn Ward, State Representatives Raúl Labrador and Ken Roberts, and physician Allan Salzberg, ran for the Republican nomination to challenge Minnick. Roberts eventually dropped out, as did Salzberg; both former candidates endorsed Labrador. Vaughn Ward's campaign received coverage from as far away as Great Britain as Sarah Palin came to Idaho endorse Ward, who was one of the National Republican Congressional Committee's Young Guns. Critics seized on various troubles with the campaign, including multiple instances of plagiarism, Ward's failure to vote in the 2008 presidential elections and his referral to Puerto Rico as a "country." Ultimately, despite the fact that many prominent conservatives had lined up behind Ward, Labrador triumphed in a contentious primary election.

General election
A contentious general election ensued, with both Minnick and Labrador launching aggressive campaign ads against each other. When Labrador accused the Congressman of supporting a middle class tax increase in a television ad, controversy quickly ensued; Idaho Public Television threatened to pull the ad for its inaccuracy and critics accused Labrador of taking Minnick's remarks out of context. When Minnick aired an ad, Labrador attacked it for including pictures that made him "look like an illegal immigrant." Minnick strongly stressed his independent credentials; his claims were seemingly validated when the Tea Party Express, the largest group affiliated with the broader movement, endorsed his campaign for re-election. Going into election night, polling indicated Minnick with a lead over Labrador, but after the votes were tallied, Labrador defeated Minnick by a solid margin in a surprising upset.

Polling

Results

District 2

Campaign
This conservative district, based in eastern Idaho and the Magic Valley region of Idaho, has been represented by incumbent Republican Congressman Mike Simpson since he was first elected in 1998. Simpson did not face a serious challenge in his bid for a seventh term from Democratic candidate Mike Crawford or independent candidate Brian Schad and was re-elected by a large margin on election day.

Results

References

External links
Elections Division at the Idaho Secretary of State site
U.S. Congress candidates for Idaho at Project Vote Smart
Idaho U.S. House from OurCampaigns.com
Campaign contributions for U.S. Congressional races in Idaho from OpenSecrets
2010 Idaho General Election graph of multiple polls from Pollster.com

House - Idaho from the Cook Political Report

Idaho
2010
2010 Idaho elections